A Mary Christmas is the eleventh studio album and first Christmas album by American R&B recording artist Mary J. Blige. It was released on October 15, 2013, by Matriarch, Interscope and Verve Records. The album was primarily produced by David Foster, and features guest appearances from Barbra Streisand, Chris Botti, Jessie J, The Clark Sisters, and Marc Anthony.

The album peaked at number ten on the US Billboard 200, becoming her twelfth top-ten entry on the chart. It also peaked at number five on the Top R&B/Hip-Hop Albums chart. It marked Blige's fifteenth top-ten entry on the latter chart, tying her with Snoop Dogg for second-most top ten entries in the Nielsen SoundScan era.
Upon its release, A Mary Christmas received generally mixed reviews amongst critics. The album was certified Gold by the Recording Industry Association of America (RIAA) on December 4, 2013, denoting shipments of 500,000 copies.

Background
It was confirmed in June 2013 that Blige had been working on a Christmas album, in an interview with Charleston Scene. In that interview, Blige revealed featured artists to be on the record would be Jessie J, Jennifer Lopez, Marc Anthony and Barbra Streisand, with whom she duets a "jazzy version" of "When You Wish Upon a Star."

This album is the first collaboration between legendary producer and hit-maker David Foster and Blige. The album will also be released on The Verve Music Group, in which Foster is the chairman of. Foster is also the producer of multi-platinum Christmas albums by Michael Bublé, Rod Stewart, Andrea Bocelli, Josh Groban and Celine Dion.
Chris Walden wrote two arrangements for the album.

Critical reception 

A Mary Christmas received generally mixed or average reviews from critics. At Metacritic, which assigns a normalized rating out of 100 to reviews from mainstream publications, the album received an average score of 49, based on 5 reviews. Andy Kellman of AllMusic rated A Mary Christmas three out of five stars. He felt that the album "won't likely reach the high status of, say, Mariah Carey's Merry Christmas, but it's a full-effort holiday release that many of her fans should be able to enjoy for several years." Tim Jonze of The Guardian gave the album 2 stars, saying that it seemed very similar to a formula used by The X Factor contestants of putting out Christmas albums. He applauded Blige's vocals, but specifically criticized her cover of Rudolph the Red-Nosed Reindeer, calling it unlistenable. Eric Henderson of Slant Magazine gave the album 2.5 out of 5 stars, criticizing the album for not taking any risks, along with the kid-friendly songs included on the album. Randy Lewis of the Los Angeles Times gave the album 2 stars, criticizing the album's overproduction, stating the production made the songs very overwhelming.

Commercial performance 
A Mary Christmas debuted at number 23 on the US Billboard 200 and at number 5 on the Top R&B/Hip-Hop Albums with first week sales of 12,000 copies. After four weeks of fluctuating on the chart, A Mary Christmas entered the top 20 for the first time in its sixth week, rising from number 22 to number 13 with a 110% sales increase to 31,000 copies. In its seventh week, the album experienced an 82% increase to 57,000 copies sold, despite falling two positions to number 15. In its eight-week, the album rose to number 10 despite a 10% drop to 51,000 copies, giving Blige her 12th top ten album. A Mary Christmas rose less than 1% to 52,000 copies sold in its ninth week, falling one spot to number 11. In its tenth week, A Mary Christmas fell to number 13 with a 25% increase to 64,000 copies sold, the album's best-selling week. In its eleventh week, the album sold approximately 32,000 copies (a decline of  49% from the previous week) and placed at number 21 on the Billboard 200, reflecting the end of the 2013 holiday season. A Mary Christmas was the third best-selling Christmas album of 2013 with 328,000 copies sold for the year.

On December 4, 2013, the album was certified Gold by the RIAA.

Track listing
All songs produced by David Foster.

Charts

Weekly charts

Year-end charts

Certifications

References

External links
 MaryJBlige.com — official site

Mary J. Blige albums
2013 Christmas albums
Albums produced by David Foster
Christmas albums by American artists
Contemporary R&B Christmas albums
Verve Records albums